Claudia Elisabeth Maria van Thiel (born December 22, 1977 in Wijchen, Gelderland) is a retired female volleyball player from the Netherlands, who represented her native country at the 1996 Summer Olympics in Atlanta, Georgia, finishing in fifth place under the guidance of head coach Bert Goedkoop.

References

1977 births
Living people
People from Wijchen
Dutch women's volleyball players
Volleyball players at the 1996 Summer Olympics
Olympic volleyball players of the Netherlands
Sportspeople from Gelderland